The Rowridge transmitting station is a facility for FM radio and television transmission at Rowridge on the Isle of Wight in southern England.

There is a smaller tower on the site belonging to British Telecom. Prior to Digital Switchover (DSO) the station broadcast with a power of 250 kW (ERP) for FM radio, 500 kW for analogue television, and 20 kW for digital television. In July 2007, Ofcom confirmed that Rowridge would remain an A Group transmitter at Digital switchover; the digital television transmission signal was then boosted to 200 kW. From March 2018 MUXES 7 & 8 moved out of the A group to channels 55 & 56 (see graph), though these are due to be turned off between 2020 and 2022.

Rowridge is one of only two main transmitters (the other is the rather smaller transmitter of Rosneath in Scotland) to broadcast its output on both horizontal and vertical polarities. Only the main 6 MUXES are transmitted in vertical polarity.
The reason for this dual polarity transmission is to give a second option to those experiencing co-channel interference from transmitters on the continent.

Analogue Channel 5 was not transmitted from Rowridge but was broadcast (at 10 kW) from Fawley Power Station, with the antenna located on the main chimney. Transmissions all fitted within the A group and were horizontally polarised. On 25 March 2009, Channel 5's analogue signal was turned off from Fawley Power Station, due to the digital switchover in the neighbouring Westcountry region.

Population coverage for the main four analogue channels was about 1.75 million.

History

The station was first built to provide BBC 405-line television coverage for an area including Southampton, Portsmouth, Bournemouth, Chichester, Brighton, Winchester and Salisbury. Sites on the mainland and the Isle of Wight were considered, and three were tested by BBC Research Department. A temporary 200 ft lattice mast was built with a main antenna at 175 ft and a reserve antenna lower down. These aerials were directional to enhance the signal northwards and reduce unwanted coverage to the south.

It was built by BICC, alongside Pontop Pike (also 500ft) and North Hessary Tor in Devon (a taller mast).

The service opened on 12 November 1954, bringing television to the area for the first time.

A programme feed was obtained via a Post Office radio link, using refurbished equipment that provided the original picture feed for the Wenvoe Transmitter on the British Telecom Microwave Network. A site for this near Alton, Hampshire was acquired and named after a nearby pub: Golden Pot. Here the TV signal from Alexandra Palace was picked up and relayed via a one-hop 4 GHz microwave link to Rowridge. This was brought into service on 18 October 1954. Later, the microwave link ran from the Museum telephone exchange in London to Rowridge, using Golden Pot as an intermediate site.

In 1965 the UHF antenna was added making the total height of the structure . This addition allowed Rowridge to radiate the PAL 625-line transmission that allowed broadcasts in colour and eventually stereo sound, using NICAM.

On 25 March 2009, Channel 5's analogue signal was turned off from Fawley Power Station. Later on in the day, "existing digital terrestrial TV services moved to new frequencies", due to the digital switchover happening in the region in 2012.

Arqiva applied for planning permission to replace the existing 150m (492') mast with one 187m (614') high on 22 May 2009.

Channels listed by frequency

Analogue radio

Digital radio

Analogue television

12 November 1954 – 15 January 1966

15 January 1966 – 13 December 1969

13 December 1969 – 27 December 1969

27 December 1969 – 4 December 1982

4 December 1982 – 3 January 1985

3 January 1985 – 15 November 1998

Analogue and digital television

15 November 1998 – 31 October 2002

31 October 2002 – 24 May 2007

24 May 2007 – 25 March 2009

25 March 2009 – 7 March 2012

7 March 2012 – 21 March 2012

Digital television

21 March 2012 – 18 April 2012

18 April 2012 – present
The commercial multiplexes were situated on their pre-DSO frequencies until 18 April 2012, when they started transmitting at vertical polarisation.

See also
List of masts

References

External links
Info and pictures of Rowridge transmitter including historical power/frequency changes and present co-receivable transmitters
Entry for Rowridge transmitting station at the Transmission Gallery
Freeview on the Rowridge transmitter
Rowridge Transmitter at thebigtower.com

Transmitter sites in England
Buildings and structures on the Isle of Wight
Towers on the Isle of Wight